Glenea pseudoscalaris is a species of beetle in the family Cerambycidae. It was described by Léon Fairmaire in 1895. It is known from Vietnam, China and Taiwan.

Subspecies
 Glenea pseudoscalaris miwai Mitono, 1943
 Glenea pseudoscalaris pseudoscalaris (Fairmaire, 1895)

References

pseudoscalaris
Beetles described in 1895